John Gill (1732-1785) was a printer in Boston, Massachusetts, in the 18th century. With Benjamin Edes he issued the Boston Gazette newspaper. He later published the Continental Journal, 1776-1785.

Biography
Gill was born in 1732 in Charlestown, Province of Massachusetts; siblings included Moses Gill. He trained as a printer with Samuel Kneeland. He also married one of Kneeland's daughters.

Gill was the brother of Hon. Moses Gill who after the revolution, was for several years Lieutenant-Governor of the commonwealth of Massachusetts. Gill died August 25, 1785, and leaving several children. His death was announced in his Continental Journal, and contained the following tribute:

Edes & Gill printed the Boston Gazette from 1755 until 1775. During the British occupation of Boston, (1775-1776), "Gill remained in Boston during the siege; he did no business." "After the evacuation of Boston, his connection with Edes ended. They divided their stock, and settled their concerns. While Edes continued the publication of the Gazette, Gill issued another paper, entitled The Continental Journal. Having published this paper several years, he sold the right of it, in 1785, with his printing materials, to James D. Griffith."

References

External links

 Boston 1775 blog. John Gill: Luckless Printer, 2009

American printers
American publishers (people)
People from colonial Boston
1732 births
1785 deaths
18th century in Boston
People of colonial Massachusetts